"Cold" is a song by English rapper Stormzy. It was released as the second single from his debut studio album Gang Signs & Prayer on 24 February 2017, by #Merky Records. It peaked at number twenty-one on the UK Singles Chart.

Chart performance
On 3 March 2017, the song entered the UK Singles Chart at number twenty-one.

Charts

Weekly charts

Certifications

Release history

References 

2017 singles
Stormzy songs
2017 songs
Songs written by Stormzy